Anderson Costa may refer to:

 Ânderson Lima (footballer, born 1973), Brazilian football right wing-back
 Anderson Lima (footballer, born 1979), Brazilian football defensive midfielder